The 1982–83 Memphis State Tigers men's basketball team represented Memphis State University as a member of the Metro Conference during the 1982–83 NCAA Division I men's basketball season.

The Tigers won Metro Conference regular season and conference tournament titles to receive an automatic bid to the 1983 NCAA tournament. As No. 4 seed in the East region, Memphis State beat No. 5 seed Georgetown to reach the Sweet Sixteen for the second of three straight seasons. The No. 1 Houston Cougars defeated Memphis State, 70–63, in the regional semifinal. The Tigers finished with a 23–8 record (6–6 Metro), though the NCAA tournament results would later be vacated.

Roster

Schedule and results

|-
!colspan=9 style= | Regular season

|-
!colspan=9 style= | Metro Conference tournament

|-
!colspan=9 style= | NCAA Tournament

Rankings

References

Memphis Tigers men's basketball seasons
1982 in sports in Tennessee
1983 in sports in Tennessee
Memphis State
Memphis State